Michelle Turk (born 23 September 1967) is an Australian former professional tennis player.

Turk, who comes from the Illawarra region of New South Wales, was one of the country's top junior players, training at the AIS in Canberra.

In 1985 she made the junior singles quarter-finals of the Australian Open and featured in the women's doubles main draw, where she and partner Louise Field were beaten in the first round by number one seeds Martina Navratilova and Pam Shriver. She also teamed up with Field that year to win a $25,000 satellite tournament on the Gold Coast.

While competing on the professional tour she reached a career best singles ranking of 255 in the world and played as a wildcard in the women's singles main draw of the 1987 Australian Open.

ITF finals

Doubles: 5 (1–4)

References

External links
 
 

1967 births
Living people
Australian female tennis players
Tennis people from New South Wales
Sportspeople from Wollongong